Cathedral High School is a private, college preparatory Catholic all-boys school in Los Angeles, California.

History

Cathedral High School was founded by Archbishop John Joseph Cantwell as the first Los Angeles Archdiocesan high school for boys in Fall 1925. The school was built on the site of old Calvary Cemetery, where leading families of Los Angeles were buried until relocated at the turn of the 20th century.  It is just northeast of downtown Los Angeles.

Cathedral was the first high school for boys established by the Archdiocese. The Christian Brothers have administered the school since its founding and In 1996, a historic agreement was reached with the Archdiocese allowing the school to operate as a private Lasallian institution. Cathedral's location allows for a view of the Los Angeles skyline and the new Cathedral of Our Lady of the Angels and adjacent to Dodger Stadium in Chávez Ravine and Chinatown, Los Angeles, California.The school was designated Los Angeles Historic-Cultural Monument number 281 in 1984.

The school athletics teams are nicknamed the Phantoms because of its location on the old cemetery.

Campus renovation
Plans were announced in 2003 for a new building to house classrooms and the gym. The building was funded mainly by donations. Construction began in 2005 with the demolition of the old, sixty-five-year-old gym and was complete in 2007. The new building houses items from the previous building, including the old scoreboard and wood floor.

Notable alumni
 Sal Castro, American educator and activist
 Dwayne Hickman, American actor and director
 Isaiah Jewett, 2020 Olympian in the 800 meters.
 Xolo Maridueña, American actor
 Bob McMillen, 1952 Summer Olympic Silver medalist in Helsinki, Finland, in the metric mile, 1500 meters
 Antonio Villaraigosa, mayor of Los Angeles (expelled in his Junior year)
 Bryce Young, American football quarterback for the Alabama Crimson Tide (transferred to Mater Dei in his Junior year)
Eric "Bobo" Correa, percussionist and a member of the bands Beastie Boys

Filming
Cathedral High School has been the film location for a number of films, television shows, and music videos, due to its view of the Los Angeles skyline and character of its architecture, including the films City of Angels (1998), All You've Got (2006), Be Somebody (2016), the music video "I Do!!" by Toya, and "Mesmerize" by Ja Rule featuring Ashanti  and a 2010 episode of Bones, among others. All You've Got used Cathedral's colors (purple and white) and name (Phantoms) for a volleyball team featured in the film.

References

External links
 

Boys' schools in California
Educational institutions established in 1925
Lasallian schools in the United States
Roman Catholic secondary schools in Los Angeles County, California
High schools in Los Angeles
Los Angeles Historic-Cultural Monuments
Chinatown, Los Angeles
Catholic secondary schools in California
1925 establishments in California